Stuart Block (born 6 January 1979) is an English cricketer. He played six first-class matches for Cambridge University Cricket Club between 2000 and 2001. In April 2001, he carried his bat in a match against Kent County Cricket Club.

See also
 List of Cambridge University Cricket Club players

References

External links
 

1979 births
Living people
English cricketers
Cambridge University cricketers
Sportspeople from Hereford
Cambridge MCCU cricketers